Uzbekistan competed at the 2020 Summer Paralympics in Tokyo, Japan, from 24 August to 5 September 2021.

Medalists

Competitors
Source:

Athletics 

16 athlete in 22 events have been selected to compete for Uzbekistan at the 2020 Summer Paralympics including Doniyor Saliev who qualified for the men's long jump T12 event after winning the gold medal in the men's long jump T12 event at the 2019 World Para Athletics Championships. Nozimakhon Kayumova qualified for the women's javelin throw F13 event after winning the bronze medal at the 2019 World Para Athletics Championships. Safiya Burkhanova qualified for the women's shot put F12 event after winning the silver medal at the 2019 World Para Athletics Championships.

Canoeing 

Uzbekistan has sent three athlete in Men's KL2, VL3 & Women's KL3 events.

Powerlifting

Judo

Rowing

Shooting

Swimming 

Uzbekistan is scheduled to compete 6 athlete in 20 events in swimming at the 2020 Summer Paralympics.

Taekwondo 

3 athlete have been selected to compete for Uzbekistan at the 2020 Summer Paralympics

See also 
 Uzbekistan at the Paralympics
 Uzbekistan at the 2020 Summer Olympics

References 

Nations at the 2020 Summer Paralympics
2020
Summer Paralympics